Bareilly Cantt railway station (station code: BRYC), previously known as Chanehti Railway station (station code: CHTI), is a railway station on the Lucknow–Moradabad line located in the city of Bareilly in Uttar Pradesh, India. It is under the administrative control of the Moradabad Division of the Northern Railway zone of the Indian Railways.

It was previously known as Chanehti Railway station and was renamed as Bareilly Cantt railway station on 29 Sep 2016 following a decade long demand from a local group of Ex-servicemen. Three Passenger trains stop at the station.

Gallery

References

External links 

Moradabad railway division
Railway stations in Bareilly